Jack Justin Crawford (born 7 September 1988) is a former English American football defensive end. He played college football at Penn State University and was drafted by the Oakland Raiders in the fifth round of the 2012 NFL Draft. He has also played for the Dallas Cowboys, Atlanta Falcons, Tennessee Titans, and Arizona Cardinals.

Early years
Growing up in Kilburn, London, he attended high school at the City of London School, where he was in the same class as Harry Potter actor Daniel Radcliffe. At the age of seven, Crawford was diagnosed with alopecia universalis, a rare, autoimmune disease causing the total loss of all hair on the body.

After moving to the United States in 2005, he attended St. Augustine Preparatory School while he resided in Longport, New Jersey. Although he intended to pursue basketball, he couldn't play as a sophomore because of an international transfer rule and decided to join the American football team with no previous experience.

As a senior, he found success at defensive end and tight end, being rated as the fifteenth defensive end in the nation (Scout.com), while registering 12 touchdown catches. He received All-area and All-Parochial honors. He also practiced basketball and soccer.

College career
Crawford accepted a football scholarship from Pennsylvania State University. As a true freshman, he appeared in all games, playing both defensive tackle and tight end, while recording 4 tackles and 2 passes defensed.

As a sophomore, he replaced Aaron Maybin and started all 13 games at defensive end, ranking ninth in the Big Ten Conference in tackles for loss (15) and tenth in sacks (5.5). He also made 31 tackles, 2 fumble recoveries (tied for the team lead), 3 pass breakups and one forced fumble.

As a junior he appeared in 10 games with 7 starts. In the fifth game against the University of Iowa, he suffered ligament damage in his right foot and missed the next 3 contests. He compiled  14 tackles (4.5 for loss) and 2 sacks.

As a senior, he started all 13 games, posting 42 tackles (7.5 for loss), 6.5 sacks, 6 passes defensed and 2 fumble recoveries.

Professional career

Oakland Raiders
Crawford was selected by the Oakland Raiders in the fifth round (158th overall) of the 2012 NFL Draft. As a rookie, he was a backup player, appearing in 4 games and registering 5 tackles. He was declared inactive in 12 contests.

In 2013, he played all along the defensive line, appearing in 15 games, while recording 12 tackles (one for loss) and 2 quarterback pressures. He was waived on 30 August 2014.

Dallas Cowboys
On September 2, 2014, Crawford was signed as a free agent by the Dallas Cowboys, who had scouted him during joint training camp practices with the Oakland Raiders. He missed 3 games with a calf injury before returning to play in London against the Jacksonville Jaguars, tallying two tackles, one sack, one quarterback pressure and forced a fumble. He suffered a right broken thumb against the New York Giants and was placed on the injured reserve list on 26 November. He appeared in 6 games as a reserve player, making 7 tackles (one for loss), 2 sacks, 2 quarterback pressures and one forced fumble.

In 2015, he played in every game (one start) at both defensive tackle and defensive end, finishing with 18 tackles (3 for loss), 4 sacks, 10 quarterback pressures and one pass defensed. He had 4 tackles in the season finale against the Washington Redskins.

On April 4, 2016, Crawford re-signed with the Cowboys on a one-year, $1.1 million contract. He made a career-high 10 starts, mostly at left defensive end, posting 27 tackles, 3.5 sacks (fifth on the team) and 12 quarterback pressures (fifth on the team). During the games he was used at multiple positions along the defensive line. He had 4 tackles, one sack and one quarterback hurry in the second game against the Washington Redskins. He made 3 tackles (2 for loss), one sack and 2 quarterback hurries in the season finale against the Philadelphia Eagles.

Atlanta Falcons
On March 9, 2017, Crawford signed a three-year contract with the Atlanta Falcons. He was a backup defensive tackle, appearing in 4 games with 5 tackles and 3 quarterback hurries. On October 3, he was placed on the injured reserve list after suffering a bicep injury in Week 4.

In 2018, he was named the starter at left defensive tackle after Dontari Poe left in free agency. He appeared in all 16 games with a career-high 11 starts, while finishing the season with 35 tackles (7 for loss), six sacks, 9 quarterback hurries, one pass defensed, one forced fumble, and one interception. He had 4 tackles and a half sack against the Cincinnati Bengals. He made 4 tackles, 2 sacks and one quarterback hurry against the Washington Redskins.

In 2019, he was passed on the depth chart by Tyeler Davison in the seventh game of the season against the Tennessee Titans. Crawford appeared in all 16 games with 4 starts, collecting 27 tackles (one for loss) and a half sack. He had 4 tackles against the Minnesota Vikings. He made 4 tackles against the Los Angeles Rams.

Tennessee Titans
On April 8, 2020, Crawford was signed by the Tennessee Titans. He was placed on the reserve/COVID-19 list by the team on 7 August 2020. He was activated on 20 August 2020. Crawford finished the 2020 season with 28 tackles, two sacks, and a forced fumble.

Arizona Cardinals
On August 10, 2021, Crawford signed with the Arizona Cardinals. He was placed on injured reserve on August 24, 2021.

Retirement
Crawford announced his retirement on May 17, 2022 after 10 seasons in the NFL.

References

External links
Tennessee Titans bio
Penn State Nittany Lions bio
ESPN Profile

1988 births
Living people
American football defensive ends
American football defensive tackles
Arizona Cardinals players
Atlanta Falcons players
Dallas Cowboys players
English players of American football
Oakland Raiders players
Penn State Nittany Lions football players
People from Longport, New Jersey
Players of American football from New Jersey
Sportspeople from Atlantic County, New Jersey
Sportspeople from London
St. Augustine Preparatory School alumni
Tennessee Titans players
Ed Block Courage Award recipients